Amt Unterspreewald is an Amt ("collective municipality") in the district of Dahme-Spreewald, in Brandenburg, Germany. Its seat is in the town Golßen.

The Amt Unterspreewald consists of the following municipalities:
Bersteland
Drahnsdorf
Golßen
Kasel-Golzig
Krausnick-Groß Wasserburg
Rietzneuendorf-Staakow
Schlepzig
Schönwald
Steinreich
Unterspreewald

Demography

References

Unterspreewald
Dahme-Spreewald